Gose or GOSE may refer to:

Gose (surname), a surname
Gose, a German beer style
Gose, Nara, a city in Nara Prefecture, Japan
Gosë, a municipality in western Albania
Gose (river), in Lower Saxony, Germany
GOSE, signifying a Grand Officer of the Military Order of Saint James of the Sword, a Portuguese order of chivalry